San Pedro Ocopetatillo is a town and municipality in Oaxaca in south-western Mexico.  It is part of the Teotitlán District in the north of the Cañada Region.

References

YUPI

Municipalities of Oaxaca